God's Step Children is a 1938 American drama film directed by Oscar Micheaux and starring Jacqueline Lewis. The film is inspired by a combination of elements shared from two previously released Hollywood productions, Imitation of Life and These Three.

Plot
A young black woman arrives at the home of Mrs. Saunders, a widow who is black, and begs her to look after her light-skinned baby, whom she cannot afford to feed. At first she says this is temporary while she looks for work, but leaves declaring she will never be back. Mrs. Saunders pledges to raise the child as her own, along with her own son Jimmie. She names the child Naomi.

Nine years later, schoolgirl Naomi is thought by the other black children to be aloof and they accuse the light-complexioned child of not wanting to be black. This looks true the day Naomi disappears on her way to school and Jimmie tells his mother that Naomi deliberately avoided the black school she was supposed to attend and instead went to a white school. Naomi denies Jimmie's accusation, saying he's lying because he hates girls. When Mrs. Cushinberry threatens to punish her for being insolent and mean, Naomi furiously explodes that she hates her and the other children and that she only came to the school because her mother sent her there. She spits in the teacher's face which results in Mrs. Cushinberry spanking her.

That evening, Mrs. Cushinberry visits Mrs. Saunders, but when she realizes that Naomi didn't tell her mother what happened that afternoon, she decides to keep silent. But Naomi has been eavesdropping, and when the teacher leaves she starts to tell her mother that the teacher was the one at fault. Then Jimmie reveals the truth: Naomi was spanked at school for being unruly and then spitting in the teacher's face. Mrs. Saunders spanks Naomi herself. Later, Naomi starts a rumor that Mrs. Cushinberry is having an affair with a married professor; soon a riot erupts at school and a crowd of angry parents marches to the school superintendent's house to demand that he fire both teachers. When Jimmie tells Mrs. Saunders about the riot, she rushes to the superintendent's office to dispel the rumor Naomi started. Because of this, Naomi is soon sent to a convent.

About ten to twelve years later Jimmie, a young man now, has earned $6,700 as a Pullman porter when he is approached by Ontrue Cowper, a gambler, who tries to interest him in investing in the numbers racket. Jimmie rejects this offer, investing in a farm instead. After proposing to his sweetheart Eva, Jimmie invites his mother to live on his new farm. Naomi returns to town, reformed by her life at the convent, and apologizes to her mother for having been a bad child. When Jimmie and Naomi are reunited, the scene implies Naomi's romantic attachment towards him. Mrs. Saunders arranges to have Jimmie take Naomi to see the city. Although things go well, Eva's Aunt Carrie doesn't trust Naomi's unnatural interest in Jimmie and believes that she should be watched.

Aunt Carrie’s suspicions prove to be well-founded as Naomi soon confesses her love for her adoptive brother. When Jimmie, Eva, and Naomi return to the country, Jimmie introduces Naomi to his friend, Clyde Wade, who immediately falls in love with her. Clyde is a dark-skinned African American with a country accent. Naomi finds him repulsive and confesses to Jimmie that she has always wanted him to marry her. Realizing that Eva would be crushed by the loss of Jimmie, Naomi consents to marry Clyde.

One year later, Naomi tells her mother that she is leaving Clyde and her newborn son and is also “leaving the Negro race" and disappears. A few years after that, Naomi comes back to the farm one night and silently creeps up to the window, through which she sees a happy family scene that will never include her. After getting one last look at her family, Naomi drowns herself in the river.

Cast

 Jacqueline Lewis as Naomi, as a Child
 Ethel Moses as Mrs. Cushinberry / Her Daughter Eva
 Alice B. Russell as Mrs. Saunders
 Dorothy Van Engle as Naomi's mother (uncredited)
 Trixie Smith as A Visitor (deleted scene; featured in trailer)
 Charles Thompson as Jimmie, as a Child
 Carman Newsome as Jimmie, as an Adult
 Gloria Press as Naomi, as an Adult
 Alec Lovejoy as Ontrue Cowper, a Gambler
 Columbus Jackson as Cowper's Associate
 Laura Bowman as Aunt Carrie
 Cherokee Thornton as Clyde Wade (uncredited)
 Sam Patterson as A Banker
 Charles R. Moore as School Superintendent 
 Consuelo Harris as Muscle Dancer
 Sammy Gardiner as Tap Dancer
 Leon Gross as Orchestra Leader
 Dolly Jones, dancing as an extra

Production
The American Film Institute's catalog reports that some original material was removed from the film after censors raised objections. Some of the excised scenes featured more insight into child Naomi's hatred toward black people and her desire to be white. Other footage includes adult Naomi with a white husband after she tries to pass as white (at the film's climax), only to be rejected by him when he learns of her black heritage. However, some of the removed footage may still be seen in the film's opening preview trailer.

The film's script is based on a short treatment titled "Naomi Negress!" written by Alice B. Russell, the wife of director Oscar Micheaux who plays Mrs. Saunders.

It was reported that members of a youth communist group objected to the film's racial characterizations.

Critical debate
God's Step Children has been hailed as a masterpiece and denounced as stereotypical and racially denigrating. Protests at the time of the film's release apparently targeted scenes and dialogue in which Micheaux repeated his long-standing criticisms of his race, charging it with a lack of ambition and an inability to plan. As in previous Micheaux films, God's Step Children seems to repeat the same bias in favor of light-skinned blacks that it also attempts to critique. The "bad" blacks, such as the gamblers, are dark-complexioned. Clyde, whom Naomi rejects, is also dark and speaks in a buffoonish country accent. The film does not engage timely sociopolitical issues as forcefully as did earlier Micheaux films such as Within Our Gates or Symbol of the Unconquered.

References

External links

1938 films
1938 drama films
1930s English-language films
African-American drama films
American black-and-white films
Films directed by Oscar Micheaux
Films about interracial romance
1930s American films